Autocannons are automatic guns with calibers of 20mm to 57mm. There are many types including chain guns, gast guns, revolver cannons, and rotary cannons. They are being used as military aircraft main guns, naval guns, anti-aircraft weapons, infantry fighting vehicle main guns and are occasionally found on reconnaissance vehicles like the LAV-25.

General autocannons

Revolver cannons

Rotary cannons

See also 
Gatling gun

 
Lists of artillery